Myosotis micrantha is a species of flowering plant belonging to the family Boraginaceae.

Its native range is Caucasus to Central Asia.

References

micrantha